Alvarez Glacier is a tributary glacier in the Explorers Range of the Bowers Mountains in Antarctica. It flows from the southwest side of Stanwix Peak into Rennick Glacier, to the north of Sheehan Glacier. It was mapped by United States Geological Survey from surveys and U.S. Navy air photos, 1960–62, and was named by the Advisory Committee on Antarctic Names for Lieutenant Commander Jose A. Alvarez, Argentine Navy, an International Geophysical Year Weather Central meteorologist at Little America V in 1957. The glacier is situated on the Pennell Coast, a portion of Antarctica lying between Cape Williams and Cape Adare.

See also
 List of glaciers in the Antarctic
 Glaciology

References
 

Glaciers of Pennell Coast